Emery Bonett (2 December 1906 – 7 November 1995) was the pen name of Felicity Winifred Carter, an English writer and playwright. Her books were made into films. She wrote several mystery, suspense and detective novels in collaboration with her husband, John Bonett, published during the 1940s-60s.

Life
Felicity Winifred Carter was born in Ecclesall, Sheffield, to John Carter and Winifred (née Naylor). Her father worked in his Sheffield-based family firm of manufacturing chemists, Carter and Sons Ltd. She came from a literary family: her mother, Winifred Carter, was a prolific author, as was her uncle, John L. Carter, and her aunt, Edith Carter, penned several plays.

Initial success came with A Girl Must Live, which was first serialized in Leisure magazine and later published as a novel in 1936. It was also adapted as a 1939 film of the same name, starring Margaret Lockwood.

She married John Hubert Arthur Coulson (John Bonett), at Westminster Registry Office, London on 21 January 1939. They had one son, Nicholas (Nick) John Coulson, born 2 January 1947, at Queen Charlotte’s Hospital, Hammersmith, London.

She lived in Spain with her husband during her later years.

John planned the books and Emery did most of the actual writing:  the partnership is described by the self-penned blurb in the Penguin edition of No Grave for a Lady:
"John and Emery Bonett met at a Spanish language class. Instead of learning Spanish they became engaged. Emery had been a repertory actress, a scene-painter, a showgirl at the Prince of Wales, the back legs of a horse, and finally a writer. She was working as an ‘extra’ in a film studio when she heard that her first novel, A Girl Must Live, had been accepted for publication. The next time she set foot in the same studio was to see the film version of the story being made.
John had been in various disreputable professions: banker, company secretary, Civil Servant, journalist, sales promotion executive. Emery found he had imagination and plot-sense as well as grammar and a distorted sense of humour, not to mention a magnificent grasp of facts – which always eluded Emery. So she brought him into the writing business... Jointly and separately they have written for radio and television, short stories, song lyrics, and film scripts."

Combined works of John and Emery Bonett

Novels (with first UK/US publishing date)

Credited to Emery Bonett:

A Girl Must Live 1936/—
Never Go Dark 1940/—
Make Do With Spring 1941/—
High Pavement (US title: Old Mrs Camelot) 1944/1944

Credited to John and Emery Bonett:

Dead Lion 1949/1949
A Banner for Pegasus (US title: Not in the Script) 1951/1951
No Grave for a Lady 1960/1959
Better Dead (US title: Better Off Dead) 1964/1964
The Private Face of Murder 1966/1966
This Side Murder? (US title: Murder On the Costa Brava) 1967/1967
The Sound of Murder 1970/1971
No Time to Kill 1972/1972

Credited to John Bonett:

Perish the Thought 1984/—

BBC Radio plays (with first broadcast date)
One Fine Day 27.10.44 Home Service – included in Radio Theatre: Plays Specially Written for Broadcasting, edited and introduced by Val Gielgud; published: MacDonald & Co, London, 1946
Mr Beverly Plays God 15.7.46 Home Service
The Puppet Master 29.1.48 Home Service – included in Five Radio Plays, edited and introduced by Val Gielgud; published: Vox Mundi, London, 1948
Divorce From Reality 16.11.52 Light Programme
Deadly Nightingale 15.8.62 Home Service
Manalive 31.10.62 Home Service – recording now lost
The Gossamer Syndrome 7.4.75 Radio 4

Television (with first broadcast date)
One Fine Day UK 14.8.47
Face to Face UK 11.8.51
Douglas Fairbanks Jr. Presents: Blue Murder US/UK 24.8.55
The Puppet Master US 24.1.56

Films
A Girl Has to Live (US title: A Girl Must Live) UK 1939 – based on eponymous novel
One Exciting Night aka You Can’t Do Without Love UK 1944 – wrote additional dialogue
My Sister and I UK 1948 – based on novel: High Pavement
The Glass Mountain (Italian title: Montagna di cristallo) Italy/UK 1949 – cowrote screenplay; also wrote lyrics to Take the Sun, a Nino Rota song featured in the film
Children Galore UK 1955 – cowrote screenplay

References

External links

Bonett Manuscripts Collection of published and unpublished manuscripts, novels, etc. at University of Sheffield Library.

1906 births
1995 deaths
People from Ecclesall
English crime fiction writers
English mystery writers
English women novelists
British women screenwriters
Women mystery writers
20th-century English women writers
20th-century English novelists
Writers from Sheffield
20th-century English screenwriters